Kazımcan Karataş (born 16 January 2003) is a Turkish football player who plays as a left-back for Galatasaray in the Süper Lig.

Professional career

Altay
Karataş is a youth product of Altay since the age of 6. He made his senior debut with them in January 2020 in the TFF First League. Shortly after, he signed his first professional contract with the club. He made his professional debut with Altay in a 1-0 Süper Lig loss to Antalyaspor on 6 November 2021.

Galatasaray
On 1 July 2022, Galatasaray announced that an agreement was reached with Karataş. It has been announced that an agreement has been reached with the football player for 5 seasons, starting from the 2022–23 season. Accordingly, a transfer fee of 1.150.000 Euros will be paid to Altay for the transfer of the young football player. He earned his first cap with Galatasaray on 13 August 2022, Saturday, coming from bench on 77th minute in match week 2 encounter against Giresunspor, in which Galatasaray lost at home 0–1.

International career
Karataş is a youth international for Turkey, having represented the Turkey U17s and U19s.

References

External links
 
 

2003 births
Living people
Footballers from İzmir
Turkish footballers
Turkey youth international footballers
Altay S.K. footballers
Süper Lig players
TFF First League players
Association football forwards
Galatasaray S.K. footballers